Phyllis Dixey (10 February 1914 – 2 June 1964) was an English singer, actress, dancer and impresario. Her earlier career was as a singer in variety shows in Britain. During World War II, she joined ENSA and entertained the British forces. She sang, recited and posed in naked tableaux which were very popular.

Early life and career
Phyllis Selina Dixey was born in Merton, Surrey to Ernest Dixey and Phyllis Selina Haycroft. She had one elder brother, Ernest Dixey (b. 1912). In 1938, she married Jack Tracey. 

In 1942, she formed her own company of girls and rented the Whitehall Theatre in London to put on a review called The Whitehall Follies. This was the first striptease show put on in the West End of London, but not the first show to have nude studies as the Windmill reviews were already in existence. She stayed at the Whitehall for the next five years producing the Peek-a-boo reviews. Her performance was at the time considered artistic and she thought that it was an art form. She was known as the "Queen of Striptease". She appeared in two films Love up the Pole (1936) and Dual Alibi (1946).

Last years

By 1947 the tastes of the London audience had changed, and Phyllis Dixey was forced to return to the provinces. She was not able to adapt to the direction that the public required; leaving the stage in the late 1950s, bankrupt. In the early 1960s she worked as a cook at Loseley Park near Guildford. She died of cancer in 1964, aged 50, in Epsom, Surrey.

Posthumous
Her life was portrayed in the British television film The One and Only Phyllis Dixey (1978), in which she was played by Lesley-Anne Down. It was written by Philip Purser.

In 2011, English Heritage made plans to erect a blue plaque at Dixey's former home at Wentworth Court in Surbiton; however, the installation of the plaque was turned down by the residents' association of the building due to the proposed title 'Striptease Artiste' being used on the plaque.

Filmography
 Love Up the Pole (1936)
 Dual Alibi (1947)

References

Roger Wilmut Kindly Leave the Stage: Story of Variety, 1919-60, 1985, Methuen, 
Philip Purser and Jenny Wilkes: "The One And Only Phyllis Dixey", 1978, Futura Publications, London; 
"Phyllis Dixey Her Show-Her Home", 29 January 1944. Illustrated Magazine.
Roye: "Phyllis Dixey Album The Spotlight on Beauty Series No.3". The Camera Studies Club, Elstree.
Roye: "Phyllis in Censorland", 1942, Elstree Publications Ltd. and The Camera Studies Club, a larger edition 1950s.
British Pathe film. Meet Phyllis Dixey; released 30-10-1944

1914 births
1964 deaths
Actor-managers
British erotic dancers
People from the London Borough of Merton
20th-century English singers
20th-century English women singers
Deaths from cancer in England